In topology, a branch of mathematics, for , the i-th homotopy group with coefficients in an abelian group G of a based space X is the pointed set of homotopy classes of based maps from the Moore space of type  to X, and is denoted by . For ,  is a group. The groups  are the usual homotopy groups of X.

References 

Algebraic topology
Homotopy theory

ko:호모토피 군#계수가 있는 호모토피